Chloé Maigre (born 24 December 1974) is a French gymnast. She competed in six events at the 1992 Summer Olympics.

References

1974 births
Living people
French female artistic gymnasts
Olympic gymnasts of France
Gymnasts at the 1992 Summer Olympics
People from Niamey